L. K. Samuels (born December 7, 1951), also known as Lawrence Samuels, is an American author, classical liberal, and libertarian activist. He is best known as the editor and contributing author of Facets of Liberty: A Libertarian Primer and In Defense of Chaos: The Chaology of Politics, Economics and Human Action. He coined the phrase "social chaology", which refers to the studies of complex, holistic, and self-organizing nature of society in relationship to the linear, predatory and "planned chaos" predispositions of government.

Education 
Samuels graduated from Sunny Hills High School in Fullerton, California, attended Fullerton Junior College, and in 1976 earned a bachelor's degree in commercial art with a minor in journalism from California State University, Fullerton.

Early life 
Samuels was born in Huntington Park, California, and moved two years later to the city of Fullerton in Orange County, California. He became politically active at Sunny Hills High School after listening to a speech by Dana Rohrabacher, who was later elected to U.S. Congress. Samuels co-organized a chapter of Speak-Out with Bob Conaway, and published an underground newspaper after a chapter of the Students for a Democratic Society (SDS) became active at his high school. He joined Young Americans for Freedom (YAF) in summer of 1969 and later became the Vice Chairman of Orange County YAF, which had 15-20 affiliate chapters on high schools and college campuses. At a journalism convention, Samuels won second place in the "on-the-spot-editorial" competition at the 1971 Beta Phi Gamma National Convention in Los Angeles, California. In 1973, he won a scholarship to attend the "Seminar on China Studies for Sino-American Youth" and spent five weeks in Taiwan and South Korea.

Political activities 
After interviewing Robert LeFevre, president of Rampart College in Santa Ana, for a college newspaper, Samuels organized the Jefferson-Libertarian Caucus within YAF in 1973. In the same year he became the editor and publisher of The New Horizon, an underground newspaper at Fullerton College, while writing columns for the campus newspaper The Hornet. Samuels was briefly the editor-in-chief of the official campus newspaper.

 At University of California, Fullerton in 1973, Samuels became the founder and chairman of Society for Libertarian Life (SLL). The student organization sponsored and co-sponsored speeches by Prof. Tibor Machan, Phillip Abbott Luce, Kenneth Gregg, Jr., Prof. George W. Trivoli, George H. Smith, Prof. Joel Spring, Prof. Nathaniel Branden, Prof. John Hospers, John Pugsley, Kenneth Grubbs, Jr., Sy Leon, Prof., David Bergland, Robert LeFevre, Jack Matonis, and Karl Bray. SLL published several news journals, The New Libertarian Horizon and later Libertas Review, produced a dozen position papers and spearheaded a draft-card burning demonstration in 1979, which received national attention. Samuels conducted a series of anti-tax demonstrations at IRS offices for almost a decade.

In 1979 Samuels organized the Voluntary Census Committee to oppose the decrease of privacy by the 1980 Census with the "Count Me Out" campaign. Society for Individual Liberty (SIL), the largest libertarian organization in the country at the time, awarded SLL and Samuels the 1975–76 "outstanding local libertarian organization" in the nation. In 1978 SLL sponsored a debate between State Senator John Briggs and libertarian gay-rights activist Reverend Eric Garris on Briggs-sponsored Prop. 6. This Californian initiative would have banned homosexuals from teaching in Californian schools. Briggs failed to appear at the debate and was sued by SLL and attorney David Bergland.

In 1974 Samuels joined the Peace and Freedom Party and was elected to the PFP Central Committee in Orange County. He represented the 39th Congressional district as a delegate to the PFP 1974 convention in Sacramento, which resulted in a split between libertarian and socialist factions. The libertarian faction was recognized as the legal PFP for almost two years. Samuels worked with feminist-libertarian Elizabeth Keathley's PFP campaign for California governor in 1974. Samuels was expelled by the socialist faction in 1976 after the entire PFP State Central Committee resigned and joined the Libertarian Party.

In the late 1970s, Samuels supported the founding of Rampart Institute. In 1980 Rampart Institute became a 503(c)(3) non-profit educational foundation, and Samuels became its president. Robert LeFevre, founder of Rampart College and Harry Hoiles, owner of the Santa Ana Register, were on its board of directors. Samuels was editor of its quarterly journal Rampart Individualist, and he was the managing editor of the bi-monthly New Rampart.

Samuels co-managed and later managed The Future of Freedom Conference series for five years (1980–85) in Southern California. The libertarian conference series included Professor Murray Rothbard, Robert LeFevre, Karl Hess, Professor John Hospers, Irwin Schiff, Professor David D. Friedman, Professor Thomas Szasz, Robert Anton Wilson, Timothy Leary, Professor Arthur Laffer, Ray Bradbury, Dr. Demento, Assemblyman Dennis Brown, and others.

Samuels managed two Freeland Conferences (1983–84) in Long Beach, California examine ways to create communities on floating islands, space settlements and orbiting spaceports free of government coercion. Speakers included Spencer McCallum, Gary Hudson, Poul Anderson, Robert LeFevre, Anthony Hargis, Samuel E. Konkin III, Carol Moore and Jeff Hummel, Barry Reid and Terry Savage.

In 1992, Samuels sold his typesetting and graphics business and moved to Monterey County. He became involved in real estate and real estate investment and served as Northern Vice Chair of the Libertarian Party of California (2003–2007). An occasional writer for lewrockwell.com and Campaign for Liberty, he is one of the four founders of the Foundation to End Drug Unfairness Policies (FED-UP), an anti-drug war organization that sponsors speeches by Jack Herer, Ed Rosenthal, Judge Jim Gray, Valerie Corral, and Lynnette Shaw, and provided support to medical marijuana clinics.

Samuels managed the campaign against Measure Q in Monterey County, California, a half-cent sales tax initiative in 2003. The countywide tax was initiated to increase funding for the money-losing Natividad Medical Center, a county-run hospital. Although the proponents for the sales tax increase spent almost 100 times as much as the opponents (approximately $500,000), the measure lost. Natividad Medical Center remained open, despite claims during the campaign that it would close, making record profits of nearly $13 million in the 2009-2010 financial year. Once a columnist for "Libertarian Perspective," Samuels is one of the founders and the vice chair of the Seaside Taxpayers Association.

In 2008 he was elected chairman of the Project Area Committee (PAC), a citizens committee to advise the Seaside Redevelopment Agency and the city of Seaside over eminent domain issues. Samuels is the winner of the 2007 Karl Bray Memorial Award, presented by the Samuel Adams Society.

Samuels was active in the anti-war movement during the second war in Iraq, organizing peace rallies and speeches, mostly under the non-interventionist organization Libertarians for Peace and the Peace Coalition of Monterey County. Samuels designed the "porcupeace" logo in 2008, which displays a peace symbol inside of a porcupine, created to give libertarians their own peace symbol. His magnum opus book, In Defense of Chaos: the Chaology of Politics, Economics and Human Action, was published in 2013 by Cobden Press. In the book, he writes that war is chaos and that "government in and of itself is the foremost agent for destroying order and imposing chaos."

In 2009 Samuels ran for city council for the unestablished Town of Carmel Valley as one of the leaders opposed to turning rural Carmel Valley into a city. Saying he did not want to become a politician, he asked voters: "don't vote for me, don't vote for the city." Samuels finished11th out of the 15 candidates with 4.55% of the vote.  The vote for incorporation failed. Samuels organized and hosts (co-host Jonathan Krost) a weekly radio show on KRXA 540AM in Sand City called "Left Coast Liberty: The Classical Liberal Hour" on Monday evenings. The show's first broadcast was on May 28, 2012.

In 2021, Samuels became the editor of Letters of Liberty, which posts published and unpublished letters to the editor in an effort to fight censorship.

Bibliography 
Samuel's published works include:
 Facets of Liberty: A Libertarian Primer, Freedom Press and Rampart Institute, 2nd edition, 2009, first published 1985. 
 Dreams Gone to Seed, play written in 2009.
 In Defense of Chaos: The Chaology of Politics, Economics and Human Action, first published in 2013. 
 Hitler and Mussolini: History’s Dirty Little Secret, written as content for a script to be used in the production of a documentary film.
 Killing History: The False Left-Right Political Spectrum and the Battle between the 'Free Left' and the 'Statist Left''' (2019) 
 Ferret: The Reluctant King (2020)  
 We Are Them: The Apocalypse Syndrome (2021)   
 FACETAS DE LA LIBERTAD: Un manual libertariano (Spanish Edition of Facets of Liberty) (2021) 
 We Are Them: The War Years'' (2022)

References

External links 

 lksamuels.com
 killinghistory.net
 Fedupfreedom.org
 seasidetaxpayers.org
 lettersofliberty.com

1951 births
Living people
20th-century American male writers
20th-century American non-fiction writers
21st-century American male writers
21st-century American non-fiction writers
Activists from California
American anti-war activists
American male non-fiction writers
American political writers
California Libertarians
Non-interventionism
People from Fullerton, California
People from Huntington Park, California
Writers from California